The 13th District of the Iowa House of Representatives in the state of Iowa.

Current elected officials
Chris Hall is the representative currently representing the district.

Past representatives
The district has previously been represented by:
 John C. Mendenhall, 1971–1973
 Delbert L. Trowbridge, 1973–1973
 Rollin Howell, 1973–1983
 Rod Halvorson, 1983–1995
 Michael Cormack, 1995–2003
 Bill Schickel, 2003–2009
 Sharon Steckman, 2009–2013
 Chris Hall, 2013–present

References

013